Harold is an English personal name. The modern name Harold and Harrod may have derived from the Old Danish name Harald, the Old German names Hairold or Herold, or the Old English name Hereweald. The Irish derivative is Ó hArailt.

People with the surname
 Dave Harold, (born 1966), English professional snooker player
 Edgar von Harold (1830–1886), German entomologist
 Erika Harold, (born 1980), Miss America (2003)
 Gale Harold, (born 1969), American actor
 John Harold (1873–1947), Canadian politician

See also Harrold (surname)

References

Surnames from given names
English-language surnames